Ahmed El-Gendy (born 1 March 2000) is an Egyptian modern pentathlete. He won the silver medal in the men's event at the 2020 Summer Olympics. He also competed in the 2018 Summer Youth Olympics and won gold for Egypt. He is the first athlete from Africa to medal in modern pentathlon.

At the Olympics, El-Gendy was ranked 13th after the fencing, swimming, and riding events, trailing leader and eventual gold medalist Joe Choong by 50 points, meaning he started the final laser-run 50 seconds after Choong. He made up that entire deficit during the laser-run, and briefly led during the final 800 metres; ultimately he finished second, just under five seconds behind Choong.

References

External links
 

2000 births
Living people
Egyptian male modern pentathletes
Modern pentathletes at the 2020 Summer Olympics
Olympic modern pentathletes of Egypt
Place of birth missing (living people)
Modern pentathletes at the 2018 Summer Youth Olympics
Youth Olympic gold medalists for Egypt
Olympic medalists in modern pentathlon
Olympic silver medalists for Egypt
Medalists at the 2020 Summer Olympics
21st-century Egyptian people